C. C. Stevens (31 March 1907 – 13 July 1974) was a British sound engineer. He was known for his work on the films of Powell and Pressburger, including A Matter Of Life And Death and I Know Where I'm Going. He was nominated for an Oscar for Best Special Effects for his work on the film One of Our Aircraft Is Missing. He worked on more than 80 films during his career.

References

External links

1907 births
1974 deaths
British audio engineers
People from Andover, Hampshire